Dallas County is the second-most populous county in the U.S. state of Texas. As of the 2020 U.S. census, the population was 2,613,539, making it the ninth-most populous county in the country. Dallas County is included in the Dallas-Arlington-Fort Worth metropolitan statistical area—colloquially referred to as the Dallas–Fort Worth metroplex. Municipal expansion within Dallas County has blurred the geographic lines between cities and between neighboring counties.

Its county seat is the city of Dallas, which is also Texas' third-largest city and the ninth-largest city in the United States. The county was founded in 1846 and was possibly named for George Mifflin Dallas, the 11th Vice President of the United States under U.S. President James K. Polk.

Geography 

Adjacent counties 
 Denton County (northwest)
 Collin County (northeast)
 Rockwall County (east)
 Kaufman County (southeast)
 Ellis County (south)
 Tarrant County (west)

Climate

Communities

Cities (multiple counties) 

 Carrollton (partly in Denton County and a small part in Collin County)
 Cedar Hill (small part in Ellis County)
 Combine (partly in Kaufman County)
 Coppell (small part in Denton County)
 Dallas (county seat) (small parts in Collin, Denton, Kaufman and Rockwall counties)
 Ferris (mostly in Ellis County)
 Garland (small parts in Collin and Rockwall counties)
 Glenn Heights (partly in Ellis County)
 Grand Prairie (partly in Tarrant County and a small part in Ellis County)
 Grapevine (mostly in Tarrant County and a small part in Denton County)
 Lewisville (mostly in Denton County)
 Mesquite (small part in Kaufman County)
 Ovilla (mostly in Ellis County)
 Richardson (small part in Collin County)
 Rowlett (small part in Rockwall County)
 Sachse (small part in Collin County)
 Seagoville (small part in Kaufman County)
 Wylie (mostly in Collin County and a small part in Rockwall County)

Cities 

 Balch Springs
 Cockrell Hill
 DeSoto
 Duncanville
 Farmers Branch
 Hutchins
 Irving
 Lancaster
 University Park
 Wilmer

Towns 
 Addison
 Highland Park
 Sunnyvale

Census-designated places
 Bear Creek Ranch

Other unincorporated communities 
 Sand Branch

Historical communities 

 Alpha (not incorporated)
 Buckingham (Annexed by Richardson in 1996)
 Cedar Springs (Annexed by Dallas First Settled in February 1841. In 1929 the community was annexed by the city of Dallas. )
 Duck Creek (merged into Garland in 1887)
 East Dallas (annexed by the city of Dallas in 1890 but was once a city of its own)
 Embree (merged into Garland in 1887)
 Fruitdale (annexed by Dallas in 1964)
 Hatterville (Merged into Sunnyvale in 1953)
 Hord's Ridge (Merged by Oak Cliff in 1887 per The Handbook of Texas )
 Kleberg (Absorbed by City of Dallas in 1978)
 La Reunion (Absorbed by City of Dallas in 1860)
 Letot (Northwest Dallas County, annexed by Dallas)
 Liberty Grove
 Lisbon (Absorbed by City of Dallas in 1929)
 Little Egypt
 Long Creek (Merged into Sunnyvale in 1953)
 Meaders
 New Hope (Merged into Sunnyvale in 1953 - not to be confused with the Collin County town of the same name)
 Noel Junction not incorporated, Addison/Dallas
 Oak Cliff (Annexed by Dallas in 1903)
 Penn Springs (Annexed by Duncanville in 1947)
 Pleasant Grove (Annexed by Dallas by 1962)
 Preston Hollow (Annexed by Dallas in 1945)
 Renner (annexed by Dallas in 1977)
 Rylie (annexed by Dallas in 1978)
 Scyene
 Trinity Mills (Annexed by Carrollton)
 Tripp (Merged into Sunnyvale in 1953)

Demographics 

Note: the U.S. Census Bureau treats Hispanic/Latino as an ethnic category. This table excludes Latinos from the racial categories and assigns them to a separate category. Hispanics/Latinos can be of any race.

Per the 2010 census, there were 2,368,139 people, 807,621 households, and 533,837 families residing in the county. The population density was 2,523 people per square mile (974/km2). There were 854,119 housing units at an average density of 971/sq mi (375/km2). In 2018, the U.S. Census Bureau estimated Dallas County to have a total of 2,637,772 residents, 1,027,930 housing units, and 917,276 households. By 2020, its population was 2,613,539.

In 2010, the racial and ethnic makeup of the county was 53.4% White (33.12% non-Hispanic white), 22.30% Black or African American, 0.10% Native American, 5.15% Asian, 0.06% Pacific Islander, 14.04% from other races, and 2.70% from two or more races. 38.30% of the population were Hispanic or Latino of any race. During the 2015 Texas population estimate program, non-Hispanic whites made up 713,835 of the county's residents (28.1%); non-Hispanic blacks, 565,020 (22.2%); other non-Hispanics, 197,082 (7.7%); and Hispanics and Latinos (of any race), 1,065,591 (41.9%). At the 2020 U.S. census, the racial and ethnic makeup was 27.74% non-Hispanic white, 21.61% Black or African American, 0.26% Native American, 6.94% Asian, 0.04% Pacific Islander, 0.38% some other race, 2.55% multiracial, and 40.48% Hispanic or Latino American of any race. The increase among people of color reflected nationwide demographic trends of greater diversification.

In 2010, there were 807,621 households, out of which 35.10% had children under the age of 18 living with them, 46.90% were married couples living together, 14.10% had a female householder with no husband present, and 33.90% were non-families. 27.30% of all households were made up of individuals, and 5.90% had someone living alone who was 65 years of age or older. The average household size was 2.71 and the average family size was 3.34. As of the 2010 census, there were about 8.8 same-sex couples per 1,000 households in the county.

In the wider county, the population was spread out, with 27.90% under the age of 18, 10.70% from 18 to 24, 34.40% from 25 to 44, 18.90% from 45 to 64, and 8.10% who were 65 years of age or older. The median age was 31 years. For every 100 females there were 99.80 males. For every 100 females age 18 and over, there were 98.00 males.

The median income for a household in the county was $43,324, and the median income for a family was $49,062. Males had a median income of $34,988 versus $29,539 for females. The per capita income for the county was $22,603. About 10.60% of families and 13.40% of the population were below the poverty line, including 18.00% of those under age 18 and 10.50% of those age 65 or over. At the 2020 American Community Survey, the median household income increased to $61,870.

Government and politics

Government 

Dallas County, like all counties in Texas, is governed by a commissioners' court. This court consists of the county judge (the chairperson of the court), who is elected county-wide, and four commissioners who are elected by the voters in each of four precincts.

The Commissioners' Court is the policy-making body for the county; in addition, the county judge is the senior executive and administrative position in the county. The Commissioners' Court sets the county tax rate, adopts the budget, appoints boards and commissions, approves grants and personnel actions, and oversees the administration of county government. Each commissioner also supervises a Road and Bridge District. The Commissioners Court also approves the budget and sets the tax rate for the hospital district, which is charged with the responsibility for providing acute medical care for citizens who otherwise would not receive adequate medical services.

County Commissioners

County Officials

Constables

Justices of the Peace

Courts

County Criminal Courts

County Criminal Courts of Appeals

County Civil Courts

County Probate Courts

Criminal District Courts

Civil District Courts

Family District Courts

Juvenile District Courts

County services 

The Parkland Health & Hospital System (Dallas County Hospital District) operates the Parkland Memorial Hospital and various health centers.

The Commissioners' Court meets the first and third Tuesday at the Commissioners' Courtroom located in the Dallas County Administration Building at 411 Elm St., corner of Elm and Houston streets. The building was the headquarters of the Texas School Book Depository Company until 1970. Assassin Lee Harvey Oswald shot President John F. Kennedy from a window located on the sixth floor which today houses the Sixth Floor Museum dedicated to the late president's memory.

Acts of the commissioners court are known as 'court orders'. These orders include setting county policies and procedures, issuing contracts, authorizing expenditures, and managing county resources and departments. Most importantly, the commissioners court sets the annual tax rate and the budget for Dallas County government and the courts. The commissioners also set the tax rate and budget for the Dallas County Hospital District which operates Parkland Hospital.

The commissioners court has direct control over all county offices and departments not otherwise administered by a county elected official. Those departments include Dallas County Elections, Health and Human Services, Facilities Management, Parks and Open Space Program, I.T. Services, Homeland Security and Emergency Services, among others. Through their budget making powers, the commissioners exercise indirect control over the District Attorney's office, Sheriff, District Clerk, County Clerk and County Treasurer. The commissioners also set the budget for each of the District, County, and Justice courts.

Dallas County employs a commissioners court administrator who is responsible for the day-to-day management of the commissioners court and implementing the Dallas County Master Plan and the directives of the commissioners court. The current commissioners court administrator is Darryl Martin who was hired by the commissioners in 2008.

Dallas County operates several jail facilities. They include:
 111 Riverfront Blvd (Dallas)
 North Tower Jail
 South Tower Jail - also known as the "Suzanne Kays Tower"
 West Tower Jail
 Government Center Jail - 600 Commerce Street (Dallas)
 Decker Detention Center - 899 North Stemmons Freeway (Dallas)
 (formerly) Suzanne Kays Jail - 521 North Industrial Boulevard (Dallas) - population integrated into the South Tower; demolished to clear way for the Trinity River Project

The Texas Department of Criminal Justice operates the Hutchins State Jail for men in an unincorporated area adjacent to Hutchins. Corrections Corporation of America operates the Dawson Unit, a co-gender state jail in Downtown Dallas, under contract.

Federal Correctional Institution, Seagoville, is located in Seagoville.

Politics 
Dallas County's post-war growth transformed it from a Democratic Solid South stronghold into a conservative Sunbelt county that voted for the Republican presidential candidate in every election from 1952 to 2004, except when Texas native Lyndon B. Johnson successfully ran for a full term as president on the Democratic ticket in 1964. In the 2004 election, Democrats won their first countywide administrative office since 1986 by electing Lupe Valdez to the office of Dallas County Sheriff. The last Democratic countywide administrator was D. Connally elected County Surveyor prior to the office's abolition. Democrats also won three district court benches in 2004. Two years later in 2006, Democrats swept every contested countywide race including County Judge, District Clerk, County Clerk, District Attorney and County Treasurer as well as every contested judicial seat.

Starting in 1996, Dallas County began voting more Democratic than the state of Texas as a whole, with relatively narrow wins from 1992 to 2004 even as the Republican nominee won Texas easily in 2000 and 2004. This trend culminated in 2008 when Barack Obama won Dallas County with a substantial margin. Obama's coattails allowed Democrats to win the remaining Republican held judicial seats. In 2012, Obama won Dallas County by virtually the same margin as he had done in 2008. In 2016, Hillary Clinton increased the Democratic margin of victory even further. She became the first Democrat to win 60% of Dallas County since Franklin D. Roosevelt in 1944, whilst under Donald Trump the Republicans failed to win 40% of the vote in the county for the first time since 1992.

Dallas County has had three openly LGBT elected county officials: Lupe Valdez, elected Sheriff in 2004 and served until 2017; Jim Foster, elected county judge in 2006, serving one term before defeat in the Democratic primary in 2010; and Gary Fitzsimmons, elected District Clerk in 2006.

State Board of Education members

Texas state representatives

Texas state senators

United States representatives

Education

Primary and secondary schools 
The following school districts serve Dallas County:

White flight meant the decrease of non-Hispanic white students in Dallas County K-12 school districts from 1997 until the 2014–2015 school year. The number was 138,760 in the former and 61,538 in the latter; during 2014-2015 county charter schools had about 5,000 non-Hispanic white students. In 2016 Eric Nicholson of the Dallas Observer wrote that the bulk of white K-12 enrollment is shifting to more distant suburban areas beyond Dallas County, and that "Teasing out causation is tricky" but that the perception of poverty, which many white families wish to avoid, is tied with race.

Wilmer-Hutchins Independent School District formerly served a part of the county. In 2006 WHISD officially merged into DISD.

Higher education

Community colleges 
Dallas County is served by the Dallas College system of seven community colleges. Dallas College is the designated community college for the entire county.

Public universities 
There are two public universities in Dallas County: the University of North Texas at Dallas and the University of Texas at Dallas, which is partially located in Collin County.

Private universities 
 Dallas Baptist University, located in Dallas
 University of Dallas, located in Irving
 Southern Methodist University, located in University Park

Transportation 

Dallas Area Rapid Transit provides bus and rail service to many cities in Dallas County, with Dallas being the largest.

The Trinity Railway Express, operated jointly by Dallas Area Rapid Transit and Trinity Metro, provides commuter rail service to both Dallas County and Tarrant County, connecting downtown Fort Worth with Downtown Dallas.

Major highways 

 
 
 
 
 
 
 
 
 
 
 
 
 
 
 
 
 
 
 
 
 
 
 
 
 
 
 
 

NOTE: US 67 and US 77 are not signed fully along their routes in Dallas County.

Airports

Commercial Airports 

 Love Field, located in Dallas, serves only domestic passengers.
 Dallas/Fort Worth International Airport is partially located in the city of Irving in Dallas County, and Grapevine and Euless in Tarrant County.

General Aviation Airports 

 Addison Airport is located in and owned by the city of Addison.
 Dallas Executive Airport is located in and owned by the city of Dallas.
 Mesquite Metro Airport is located in and owned by the city of Mesquite.

See also 

 Dallas County District Attorney
 List of museums in North Texas
 National Register of Historic Places listings in Dallas County, Texas
 Recorded Texas Historic Landmarks in Dallas County

References

External links 

 Dallas County Government official site
 
 History of Dallas County, Texas: from 1837 to 1887 by John Henry Brown, published 1887, hosted by the Portal to Texas History.
 Memorial and biographical history of Dallas County, Texas published 1892, hosted by the Portal to Texas History.
 Official directory, taxpayers of Dallas County, Texas published 1896, hosted by the Portal to Texas History.
 Dallas County Code (ordinances / regulations) from Municode

 
Dallas–Fort Worth metroplex counties
Texas counties
1846 establishments in Texas
Populated places established in 1846
Majority-minority counties in Texas